Thomas Hickman-Windsor, 1st Earl of Plymouth, PC (c. 1627 – 3 November 1687), was the son of Dixie Hickman and his wife Elizabeth Windsor, sister and heiress of Thomas Windsor, 6th Baron Windsor. He assumed the additional surname of Windsor and succeeded to the Windsor family's estate around Hewell Grange near Redditch in 1645. The same year he distinguished himself in the Battle of Naseby. Hickman-Windsor impressed King Charles I by relieving his garrison at High Ercall.

Upon the Restoration, the title of Baron Windsor, which had last been held by his maternal uncle Thomas, was called out of abeyance in his favour, on 16 June 1660. From 1661 to 1663, he served as Governor of Jamaica. However, he actually spent only three months in Jamaica: according to Samuel Pepys his abrupt return to England caused a good deal of comment. The reason was apparently ill health. His one notable achievement as Governor had been to order the attack by Sir Christopher Myngs on Santiago de Cuba. The raid was a success, but caused a crisis in Anglo-Spanish relations, and was later disavowed by Charles II.

He acquired the Navigation of the Warwickshire Avon from James, Duke of York and employed Andrew Yarranton to restore Pershore Sluice, thus restoring navigation from Tewkesbury to Evesham. He then sold two-thirds of the navigation above Evesham to Andrew Yarranton and others, who restored the navigation from there to Stratford-upon-Avon. He and George Digby, 2nd Earl of Bristol financed Andrew Yarranton's ultimately unsuccessful attempts to improve the River Salwarpe and River Stour to make them navigable.

He was appointed Gentleman of the Bedchamber to Charles II; in that capacity, he was sent in September 1678 with a crucial message to Danby to investigate certain allegations made by Titus Oates and Israel Tonge, thus setting in motion the Popish Plot.

On 6 December 1682, Windsor was created the first Earl of Plymouth, a new creation with the previous title holder having been Charles II's natural son Charles FitzCharles, 1st Earl of Plymouth (1675–1680). He was succeeded by his grandson Other Windsor (his curious first name is a variant of Otho, a remote ancestor).

Family
He married, firstly, Anne Savile, daughter of Sir William Savile, 3rd Baronet, and Anne Coventry, on 12 May 1656. They had three children:

Lady Mary Windsor (died 1694)
Other Windsor, Lord Windsor (1659–1684), father of Other Windsor, 2nd Earl of Plymouth
Ann Windsor (died in infancy)

On 9 April 1668, he married, secondly, Ursula Widdrington, daughter of Sir Thomas Widdrington and Frances Fairfax. They had six children:

Dixie Windsor (died 1743)
William Windsor (died 1682)
Andrews Windsor, to whom his father gave the Upper Avon Navigation
Lady Ursula Windsor (died 1737)
Lady Elizabeth Windsor (died 1736), who married, as his fourth wife, Sir Francis Dashwood, 1st Baronet.
Thomas Windsor, 1st Viscount Windsor (died 1738), to whom his father gave the Lower Avon Navigation

References

|-

1626 births
1687 deaths
3rd Dragoon Guards officers
British expatriates in Jamaica
1
Lord-Lieutenants of Worcestershire
17th-century Jamaican people
Governors of Jamaica